Regulation of electronic cigarettes varies across countries and states, ranging from no regulation to banning them entirely. For instance, e-cigarettes were illegal in Japan, which forced the market to use heat-not-burn tobacco products for cigarette alternatives. Others have introduced strict restrictions and some have licensed devices as medicines such as in the UK. However, there is no e-cigarette device that has been given a medical license that is commercially sold or available by prescription in the UK. , around two thirds of major nations have regulated e-cigarettes in some way. Because of the potential relationship with tobacco laws and medical drug policies, e-cigarette legislation is being debated in many countries. The companies that make e-cigarettes have been pushing for laws that support their interests. In 2016 the US Department of Transportation banned the use of e-cigarettes on commercial flights. This regulation applies to all flights to and from the US. In 2018, the Royal College of Physicians asked that a balance is found in regulations over e-cigarettes that ensure product safety while encouraging smokers to use them instead of tobacco, as well as keep an eye on any effects contrary to the control agencies for tobacco.

The legal status of e-cigarettes is currently pending in many countries. Many countries such as Brazil, Singapore, Uruguay, and India have banned e-cigarettes. Canada-wide in 2014, they were technically illegal to sell, as no nicotine-containing e-cigarettes are not regulated by Health Canada, but this is generally unenforced and they are commonly available for sale Canada-wide. In 2016, Health Canada announced plans to regulate vaping products. In the US and the UK, the use and sale to adults of e-cigarettes are legal. The revised EU Tobacco Products Directive came into effect May 2016, providing stricter regulations for e-cigarettes. It limits e-cigarette advertising in print, on television and radio, along with reducing the level of nicotine in liquids and reducing the flavors used. It does not ban vaping in public places. It requires the purchaser for e-cigarettes to be at least 18 and does not permit buying them for anyone less than 18 years of age. The updated Tobacco Products Directive has been disputed by tobacco lobbyists whose businesses could be impacted by these revisions. As of August 8, 2016, the FDA extended its regulatory power to include e-cigarettes, e-liquid and all related products. Under this ruling the FDA will evaluate certain issues, including ingredients, product features and health risks, as well their appeal to minors and non-users. The FDA rule also bans access to minors. A photo ID is now required to buy e-cigarettes, and their sale in all-ages vending machines is not permitted in the US. As of August 2017, regulatory compliance deadlines relating to premarket review requirements for most e-cigarette and e-liquid products have been extended from November 2017 to August 8, 2022, which attracted a lawsuit filed by the American Heart Association, American Academy of Pediatrics, the Campaign for Tobacco-Free Kids, and other plaintiffs. In May 2016 the FDA used its authority under the Family Smoking Prevention and Tobacco Control Act to deem e-cigarette devices and e-liquids to be tobacco products, which meant it intended to regulate the marketing, labelling, and manufacture of devices and liquids; vape shops that mix e-liquids or make or modify devices were considered manufacturing sites that needed to register with FDA and comply with good manufacturing practice regulation. E-cigarette and tobacco companies have recruited lobbyists in an effort to prevent the FDA from evaluating e-cigarette products or banning existing products already on the market.

In February 2014 the European Parliament passed regulations requiring standardization and quality control for liquids and vaporizers, disclosure of ingredients in liquids, and child-proofing and tamper-proofing for liquid packaging. In April 2014 the FDA published proposed regulations for e-cigarettes. In the US some states tax e-cigarettes as tobacco products, and some state and regional governments have broadened their indoor smoking bans to include e-cigarettes. , 12 US states and 615 localities had prohibited the use of e-cigarettes in venues in which traditional cigarette smoking was prohibited. In 2015, at least 48 states and 2 territories had banned e-cigarette sales to minors.

E-cigarettes containing nicotine have been listed as drug delivery devices in a number of countries, and the marketing of such products has been restricted or put on hold until safety and efficacy clinical trials are conclusive. Since they do not contain tobacco, television advertising in the US is not restricted. Some countries have regulated e-cigarettes as a medical product even though they have not approved them as a smoking cessation aid. A 2014 review stated the emerging phenomenon of e-cigarettes has raised concerns in the health community, governments, and the general public and recommended that e-cigarettes should be regulated to protect consumers. It added, "heavy regulation by restricting access to e-cigarettes would just encourage continuing use of much unhealthier tobacco smoking." A 2014 review said regulation of the e-cigarette should be considered on the basis of reported adverse health effects.

Asia 
Armenia: The sale of e-cigarettes and liquids with and without nicotine is not regulated.
Bahrain: The country allows the import of e-cigarettes and taxes them like tobacco products.
Bangladesh: Currently e-cigarette is not illegal in Bangladesh and there is no regulation for it. But the Secretary for health education to the Ministry of Health and Family Welfare stated that they have plan to impose ban on the production, import and sale of electronic cigarettes and all vaping tobaccos to prevent health consequences.
China: E-cigarettes are regarded as tobacco products in mainland China. Sales of e-cigarettes to people under 18 years of age is prohibited, and non-tobacco flavored e-cigarettes are banned from sale in China. 
East Timor: E-cigarettes are banned.
Hong Kong: Alternative smoking products ("ASPs") are defined under Part 2 of Schedule 7 to the Smoking (Public Health) Amendment Ordinance 2021.  Import, promotion, manufacture, sale or possession for commercial purposes of ASPs is banned and punishable to a fine of HK$50,000 and imprisonment for 6 months.
India:  On 18 September 2019, the Government of India imposed a ban on sale and production of e-cigarettes. Importing e-cigarettes is also banned in India.
Indonesia: From 1 July 2018, Indonesian Government starting to impose 57% tax on e-liquid, but then postponed until 1 October. Indonesian Government estimates the contribution from the tax would contribute around 100-200 billion rupiah. The tax is based on Finance Ministerial Regulation No. 146/010/2017 on tobacco.
Iran, Islamic Republic of: Sale or distribution of e-cigarettes is illegal.
Israel: In 2013, the Ministry of Health planned to extend existing laws on smoking in public places to e-cigarettes, a year after warning against the product's usage.
Japan: E-cigarettes containing nicotine were banned starting in 2010. Non-nicotine e-cigarettes are sold to adults and minors since no regulation exists for non-nicotine e-cigarettes in Japan. Now it is legal if the e-cigarette is registered as a medicinal product.
Kuwait: In 2016, the sale, importation and usage of e-cigarettes was made legal.
Malaysia: In 2015, the Malaysian National Fatwa Council issued a fatwa declaring e-cigarettes haram (forbidden) because of their harmful health effects and bad smell. Though the fatwa is not legally binding, it carries weight for religious Muslims and has caused the governments of four majority-Muslim states—Penang, Kedah, Johor, and Kelantan—to ban vaping. As a response to the fatwa, the Malaysian federal government began regulating e-liquid ingredients and vape sales to minors in 2018, marking the first federal regulations of the 2.5 billion ringgit (US$610 million) industry. A petition called "Selamatkan anak-anak Malaysia" was launched by Parent & Teacher Action Group Malaysia to urge government to ban (totally) e-cigarette and vape in Malaysia, which they managed to collect more than 100,000 signatures so far.
Nepal: Under current cigarette laws, the sale of e-cigarettes is permitted.
Pakistan:The import and sale of e-cigarettes is legal, but Pakistan Medical and Dental council find that the current health safety assessments of e-cigarettes to not yet be satisfactory.
Palestine: Regulations of e-cigarette use is unknown, but the sales of e-cigarettes is banned by the Palestinian National Authority.
Philippines: The sale of e-cigarettes had been regulated under Executive Order 106 from 2020 under former president Rodrigo Duterte, and is now regulated under Republic Act 11900 or the "Vape Regulation Bill", which lapsed into law on July 25, 2022 under the administration of President Bongbong Marcos. The government bans the use and sale of e-cigarettes, heated nicotine products, novel tobacco products, or their components to a person below 18 years of age, and was drafted under the principle of harm reduction.
Qatar: E-cigarettes have been illegal since 2014.
Saudi Arabia: Importation of e-cigarettes is banned as of 2012, except in small quantities for personal use, as is sale in public shops. However, personal consumption of e-cigarettes is permitted for those over age 18 in Saudi Arabia. Use of e-cigarettes is banned in many public, educational, religious, and cultural spaces, as well as in certain private spaces such as elevators, restrooms, and food production facilities. The Ministry of Health considers e-cigarettes tobacco products.
Singapore: E-cigarettes are currently prohibited under Section 16 (1) of the Tobacco (Control of Advertisements and Sale) Act, which is enforced by the Health Sciences Authority (HSA). This legislation prohibits the importation, distribution, sale or offer for sale of any confectionery or other food product or any toy or other article that is designed to resemble a tobacco product or the packaging of which is designed to resemble the packaging commonly associated with tobacco products. HSA takes a serious view on any person who contravenes the law. Those guilty of the offence are liable to a fine of up to $5,000 upon conviction. According to Health Minister Khaw Boon Wan, e-cigarettes are the industry's attempt to attract new users and were marketed to appeal to younger customers, including women.
South Korea: The sale and use of e-cigarettes is legal, but is heavily taxed. Electric cigarette possession among teenagers remains an issue.
Thailand: Thailand has banned e-cigarettes since 2014.
Taiwan: The sale and import of e-cigarettes is illegal in the Taiwan area. Passengers are not allowed to carry e-cigarettes and e-liquids into Taiwan.
United Arab Emirates: The sale and use of e-cigarettes has become legal from 15 April 2019.
Turkey: Sales and importation are effectively banned. Regulation of e-cigarettes is done by law 4207, which regulates smoking and was amended in June 2013 by article 26 of law 6487  to also apply to items which do not contain tobacco: "Herbal water pipes and all kind of cigarettes which do not contain tobacco but are used in a way to imitate tobacco products shall also be deemed as tobacco products."  This law requires for tobacco and related products to be licensed in order to be produced and to be imported. Since there have been no licenses given for production and importation has been banned. Vaping, being under regulation of the 4207th law, is thus forbidden indoors and on public transport, and also therefore forbidden for people under 18 years old. And thus, like tobacco products, personal import by mail or courier is forbidden.   In May 2013 the Minister of Health stated that e-cigarettes, which contain nicotine, are medical devices and thus cannot be imported unless approved by the "Turkish Medicines and Medical Devices Agency". But according to a WHO report as of 2014 e-cigarettes are not regulated as a therapeutic product.

Europe

European Union 

On 19 December 2012 the European Commission adopted its proposal to revise the European Union Tobacco Products Directive 2001/37/EC which included proposals to introduce restrictions on the use and sales of e-cigarettes.
On 8 October 2013 the European Parliament in Strasbourg voted down the commission's proposal to introduce medical regulation for e-cigarettes, but proposed that cross-border marketing of e-cigarettes be regulated similarly to tobacco products, meaning that sales of e-cigarettes to under-18s would be prohibited in the European Union, along with most cross-border advertising. Warning labels also would be required. The Parliament and Member States are involved in trilogue discussions to reach a common conclusion. In February 2014, the European Parliament approved new regulations for tobacco products, including e-cigarettes. The new regulations forbid advertising of e-cigarettes, set limits on maximum concentrations of nicotine in liquids, limit maximum volumes of liquid that can be sold, require child-proof and tamper-proof packaging of liquid, set requirements on purity of ingredients, require that the devices deliver consistent doses of vapor, require disclosure of ingredients and nicotine content, and empower regulators to act if the regulations are violated. In October 2014 e-cigarette manufacturer Totally Wicked won the right to challenge the directive at the Court of Justice of the EU. The hearing took place on 1 October 2015 and the results will not be announced until early 2016.

In autumn 2013, the e-cigarette industry ran "a determined lobbying campaign" to defeat proposed European legislation to regulate e-cigarettes like medical devices. Pharmaceutical manufacturers GlaxoSmithKline and Johnson & Johnson have lobbied the US government, the Food and Drug Administration (FDA), and the EU parliament for stricter regulation of e-cigarettes which compete with their products Nicorette gum and nicotine patches.

By country 

Albania: No information is available.
Austria: Nicotine-containing cartridges are classified as medicinal products and e-cigarettes for nicotine inhalation as medical devices. Nicotine cartridges may not be sold without a license.
Belarus: No information is available.
Belgium: A royal decree legalized the sale of nicotine containing cartridges outside of pharmacies as long as the cartridge contains not more than 2 ml and a maximum of 20 mg/ml of nicotine. The sale to a minor under the age of 18 years is prohibited.
Bosnia and Herzegovina: Nicotine-containing cartridges are not classified as tobacco products, and therefore the sale is not regulated.
Bulgaria: The sale and use of e-cigarettes are legal, as well as the sale of cartridges and liquids with nicotine
Croatia: Advertising is restricted. Vaping is banned in all public enclosed facilities. By a law passed by the parliament e-cigarettes are classified as tobacco products. Therefore, vaping is banned in all public buildings, and the sale to a minor is prohibited.
Cyprus: The export and import of vaping products is illegal. Most forms of advertising are banned. Vaping in a car is illegal when a pregnant woman or minor is present.
Czech Republic: Sales are prohibited to people under 18 years of age. The use and advertising of e-cigarettes are legal. Sale of e-cigarettes is regulated in the same way as sale of conventional cigarettes – as such, e-cigarettes cannot be sold to minors and can be sold only at places permitted to sell conventional cigarettes. Online sale with mail delivery is de facto illegal due to the impossibility for age verification, however this rule is not enforced and there are plenty of e-shops.
Denmark: Advertising is restricted. The Danish Medicines Agency classifies e-cigarettes containing nicotine as medicinal products. Thus, authorization is required before the product may be marketed and sold, and no such authorization has currently been given. The agency has clarified, however, that e-cigarettes that do not administer nicotine to the user, and are not otherwise used for the prevention or treatment of disease, are not considered medicinal devices.
Estonia: The Estonian State Agency of Medicines had previously banned e-cigarettes, but the ban was overturned in court on 7 March 2013. Currently e-liquids containing more than 0.7 mg/ml of nicotine are still considered medicine and as such cannot be legally purchased within the country due to no manufacturer being licensed properly. Following the outcome of EU tobacco directive in October 2013, the legislation is moving towards a more relaxed stance on the issue. As stated by the Estonian minister of social affairs Taavi Rõivas (in charge of tobacco regulation), e-cigarettes will receive an advertisement ban and will clearly be banned for minors but will be available for adults before the end of 2013.
Finland: The National Supervisory Authority of Welfare and Health (Valvira) declared that the new tobacco marketing ban (effective 1 January 2012) would also cover e-cigarettes, resulting in that Finnish stores or web stores can't advertise e-cigarettes because they might look like regular cigarettes. In theory, e-cigarettes with nicotine-free cartridges may still be sold, as long as their images and prices are not visible. Ordering from abroad remains allowed. Sale of nicotine cartridges is currently prohibited, as nicotine is considered a prescription drug requiring an authorization that such cartridges do not yet have. However, the Finnish authorities have decided that nicotine cartridges containing less than 10 mg nicotine, and e-liquid containing less than 0.42 g nicotine per bottle, may be legally brought in from other countries for private use. If the nicotine content is higher, a prescription from a Finnish physician is required. From a country within the European Economic Area a maximum of one year's supply may be brought in for private use when returning to Finland, while three months' supply may be brought in from outside the EEA. Mail-order deliveries from EEA countries, for a maximum of three months' supply, are also allowed.
France: The sales of e-cigarettes or machines that imitate smoking, as well as the sale of cartridges containing or not containing nicotine, are prohibited to people under 18 years of age. The e-cigarettes are considered neither as a medical device nor as a medicine, according to a 2011 opinion of the National Agency for the Safety of Medicines and Health Products (ANSM), if it is not claimed by its sellers as a smoking cessation product, if the level and amount of nicotine do not exceed the thresholds of (20 mg / ml) and 10 mL respectively. In January 2017, the French Health Law transposing the European Directive on Tobacco Products came into force and establishes a list of places where smoking is prohibited. Offenders are liable to a fine of 150 euros or more. The persons responsible for the places where the prohibition applies and who have not put in place the signage will be fined 450 euros.
Georgia: Until the introduction of new tobacco laws that was passed in 2018, there were virtually no regulation in e-cigarettes. However, since the passing of the Tobacco-Control Law 2017, persons caught smoking including using e-cigarettes have been prohibited in all enclosed areas, bar private houses and casinos and public transport, but not taxis, watercraft and designed areas in airports.
Germany Sales of e-cigarettes are prohibited for people under 18 years of age since transposition deadline for member states of the European Union regarding the Tobacco Products Directive (2014/40/EU) (including non-nicotine-containing cartridges). The use of such is not allowed in restaurants, where they are sold, and other public places.
Greece: The marketing of e-cigarettes is banned unless a Ministerial decision authorises them under certain conditions. Sales of e-cigarettes are prohibited for people under 18 years of age (only for nicotine-containing cartridges).
Hungary: The sale of nicotine-containing cartridges is legal as long as they are packaged in volumes of 10ml maximum in bottles and only sold at the official 'Nemzeti Dohánybolt' (National Tobacco Shops). At least 30% of the packaging must indicate the following text, "This product contains nicotine, which causes a strong addiction" The same restrictions apply to the sale of any e-cigarette and refillable tanker liquids as to any other tobacco product, therefore the legal purchasing age is 18 years.
Iceland:
Ireland: In Ireland, the legal age to buy a vape and use it is 18. Vape juice bottles must not under European Union Law come in a bottle more than 50ml.
Italy: Sales of e-cigarettes are prohibited for people under 18 years of age (only for nicotine-containing cartridges). In 2013 the minimum age of 16 years for the sale of cartridges containing nicotine was raised to 18 years. Whoever now sells cartridges containing nicotine to a person under 18 years of age can be fined 250-€2,000.
Kosovo: No information is available.
Latvia: The sale and use of e-cigarettes are legal.
Liechtenstein: Sales of e-cigarettes to people under 16 years of age is prohibited. All other laws regarding sales and imports are carried over from the laws of Switzerland.
Lithuania: The sale and use of e-cigarettes are legal.
Luxembourg: The sale and use of e-cigarettes are legal, and sales of e-cigarettes are prohibited to under 18s. Since a new tobacco law was introduced in 2017, persons cannot personally import e-cigarettes or e-liquid from abroad by post and vaping is prohibited in enclosed spaces like bars and restaurants.
Malta: Sales and use of e-cigarettes under 18 years of age is prohibited. Since 2010 products and smoking devices which are simulating cigarette or tobacco smoking are included to "tobacco products" as considered in the Tobacco (Smoking Control) Act.
Moldova: No information is available.
Montenegro: No information is available.
Netherlands: Since 2017, sales of e-cigarettes to people under 18 years is prohibited. Sales of e-liquid refills are regulated; with a maximum size of 10 ml per package, a maximum nicotine concentration of 20 mg/ml and strict labeling requirements including warning labels about harmfulness of nicotine. Marketing of e-cigarettes are limited to signs in shops. Dutch residents can order devices and liquids from aboard, but only from the EEA. The laws on plain packaging for tobacco which came about in 2020, extends to e-cigarettes in 2022.
North Macedonia: No information is available.
Norway: The sale and use of e-cigarettes are legal, but nicotine cartridges can only be imported from other EEA member states (e.g. the UK) for private use. Norway does not allow e-cigarette advertising.

Poland Since a revision of the tobacco prohibition law in 2016. There has been a large change in the e-cigarette regulation, previously where it was very loose. Currently there is ban on sales to under 18s, prohibition of marketing, sales online, in cigarette machines and a ban in hospitals & all public transport including PKP train stations but not in airports. Vapers who break the laws are liable to a fine of up to 500 zloty (approximately €109.70).
Portugal: The sale of nicotine-containing cartridges is restricted.
Romania The sale and use of e-cigarettes are legal, from 2016 the liquid used in e-cigarettes will have an excise duty 
Russia: E-cigarettes are not considered to be a tobacco product in Russia according to the Ministry of Health therefore sales and possessions of such devices are unregulated.
Serbia: No information is available.
Slovakia: Producers must register with the Slovak Trade Inspection and the Ministry of Health before bringing new products to the market. Companies must report annual sales reports for the Ministry of Health. Advertising of vaping products is banned.
Slovenia: Producers must register with the National Laboratory for Health, Environment and Food before bringing new products to the market. They must report annual sales reports. Companies are not allowed to import or export vaping products. Only companies licensed for the sale of tobacco products can sell vaping products. Advertising is banned. Vaping is not allowed at work, in indoor public spaces, on public transportation or in cars when minors are present.
Spain: Sales of e-cigarettes to people under 18 years is prohibited. The sale of products that imitate smoking (which also includes e-cigarettes) to minors is illegal. The Ministry of Health also said that the use and sale of e-cigarettes will soon be regulated.
Sweden: Sale of e-cigarettes is legal to sell for anyone, but sales of nicotine e-liquid is illegal to sell to anyone under the age of 18.
Switzerland: In 2018, local Swiss businesses successfully challenged the illegality of nicotine-containing liquids within the federal courts, immediately lifting the ban and enabling the sales of nicotine liquids countrywide, and in neighbouring Liechtenstein, which follows the same laws. As of December 2011, the tobacco tax does not apply to e-cigarettes and respective liquids containing nicotine.
Ukraine: Ukrainian law treats vaping products as tobacco products, subjecting them to all existing public smoking bans, meaning it’s illegal to vape anywhere smoking is not allowed. Buyers must be at least 18 years old.
United Kingdom: In the United Kingdom, the use, sale and advertising of e-cigarettes are legal, and e-cigarettes are not covered by laws restricting smoking in public places. However, businesses may choose to ban e-cigarettes. A notable example is Transport for London, banning smoking and vaping as their Conditions of Carriage. Most trains (and train platforms), airports, and coaches for public transportation have banned the use of e-cigarettes. Effective 1 October 2015, it is illegal to sell e-cigarettes or e-liquids to minors. In 2014 the government announced legislation would be brought forward to outlaw the purchase of e-cigarettes by people under the age of 18. In October 2014 the UK's Advertising Standards Authority changed the regulations on e-cigarette advertising, allowing the devices to appear in TV ads from 10 November. The first advert to take advantage of the change, promoting KiK e-cigarettes, aired on the day it came into force. In June 2015 the Welsh Government announced that under legislation it planned to pass, in Wales e-cigarettes would be included in existing bans on smoking in workplaces and other public spaces. In 2018, the Royal College of Physicians has recommended that regulation be proportionate in aiming to assure the safety of the devices, encouraging smokers to vape rather than use tobacco, and identify and stop effects that oppose the long-term objectives of the tobacco control strategy. As part of the EU's Tobacco Products Directive (TPD) directives set out in 2014, which came into effect in 2017, the maximum nicotine content of a liquid allowed within the UK is 20 mg/ml, and bottles may not contain more than 10ml of liquid and must be child-proof, tamper evident.  Finally, all e-cigarettes and liquids sold within the UK must be registered with MHRA by their respective manufacturers before they can be legally sold. Following the United Kingdom's withdrawal from the European Union, The Tobacco Products and Nicotine Inhaling Products (Amendment) (EU Exit) Regulations 2020 took the place of the TPD as the governing regulatory instrument.
Gibraltar: Sales of e-cigarettes is legal.

United States

Federal regulation

Prior to 8 August 2016, regulations concerning the use of e-cigarettes varied considerably across the United States, although there is more variation regarding laws limiting their use by youth than regarding multi-level regulations, such as banning their use in public places. The FDA classified e-cigarettes as drug delivery devices and subject to regulation under the Food, Drug, and Cosmetic Act (FDCA) before importation and sale in the US. The classification was challenged in court, and overruled in January 2010 by Federal District Court Judge Richard J. Leon, explaining that "the devices should be regulated as tobacco products rather than drug or medical products."

In March 2010, the U.S. Court of Appeals for the District of Columbia stayed the injunction pending an appeal, during which the FDA argued the right to regulate e-cigarettes based on their previous ability to regulate nicotine replacement therapies such as nicotine gum or patches. Further, the agency argued that tobacco legislation enacted the previous year "expressly excludes from the definition of 'tobacco product' any article that is a drug, device or combination product under the FDCA, and provides that such articles shall be subject to regulation under the pre-existing FDCA provisions." On 7 December 2010, the appeals court ruled against the FDA in a 3–0 unanimous decision, ruling the FDA can only regulate e-cigarettes as tobacco products, and thus cannot block their import. The judges ruled that such devices would only be subject to drug legislation if they are marketed for therapeutic use – E-cigarette manufacturers had successfully proven that their products were targeted at smokers and not at those seeking to quit. The District Columbia Circuit appeals court, on 24 January 2011, declined to review the decision en banc, blocking the products from FDA regulation as medical devices.

In April 2014, the FDA proposed new regulations for tobacco products, including e-cigarettes. The regulations require disclosure of ingredients used in e-cigarette liquids, proof of safety of those ingredients, and regulation of the devices used to vaporize and deliver the liquid. The FDA proposed regulation would ban the sale of e-cigarettes with nicotine to any individual under 18 years of age. In August 2014, attorneys general from over two dozen states advised the FDA to enact restrictions on e-cigarettes, including banning flavors. On 10 May 2016, the FDA published their deeming regulations in the Federal Register, which were to take effect on 8 August 2016. Vendors and companies had until two years afterward to prepare paperwork with the FDA to have their product remain on the market. Currently, there are lawsuits and amendments made in the works in Congress to change that provision. The lack of research on the risks and possible benefits has resulted in precautionary policymaking in the US "which often lacks grounding in empirical evidence and results in spatially uneven diffusion of policy". The time by which applications to market regulated non-combustible tobacco product devices must be submitted for review has been extended to August 8, 2022.

As of 8 August 2016, the FDA extended its regulatory power to include e-cigarettes. Under this ruling the FDA will evaluate certain issues, including ingredients, product features and health risks, as well their appeal to minors and non-users. The FDA rule also bans access to minors. A photo ID is required to buy e-cigarettes, and their sale in all-ages vending machines is not permitted. The FDA in September 2016 has sent warning letters for unlawful underage sales to online retailers and retailers of e-cigarettes. FDA regulations have also applied to the advertising of e-cigarettes since 2016. Per FDA regulations, e-cigarettes, e-liquid, and associated products cannot be advertised as safer than other tobacco products unless they have received modified risk tobacco product (MRTP) status. , this status has not been granted to any e-cigarette or e-liquid product. Though no companies have applied for an MRTP permit for their vaping products, similar heat-not-burn tobacco products have been denied MRTP status on the grounds that they are not safer than traditional cigarettes.

On December 5, 2016 HUD passed a rule banning the use of tobacco products in common areas and within each home unit. HUD did not include e-cigarettes in their list of prohibited tobacco products, and they will allow each public housing agency to make that decision. The ban includes cigarettes, cigars, pipes and waterpipes (hookahs). E-cigarettes were not included because they believe there would be no maintenance cost savings or a lowered risk of destructive fires. HUD commented that there is a lack of evidence that the vapor causes any damage to the units.

Beginning in May 2018, the FDA began to crack down on e-liquid brands whose packaging resembles food or beverage products. FDA is particularly concerned about e-liquids whose packaging resembles that of candy, juice boxes, and other products intended to appeal to children, because of concern that children will mistakenly drink the e-liquid and die of nicotine poisoning. Nicotine is especially toxic to young children, and a 60 ml bottle of e-liquid with 11 mg/ml nicotine concentration, the average e-liquid bottle in the U.S., is likely to kill a child of age 4 or younger. As such, the FDA has charged e-liquid products with branding that resembles food, candy, or beverage items as being misbranded and using false advertising, which is illegal under the Tobacco Control Act of 2009 (specifically sections 903(a)(1) and 903(a)(7)(A) of the Food, Drug, and Cosmetic Act).

In September 2018, the FDA has further strengthened its Youth Tobacco Prevention Plan by targeting the e-cigarette industry with fines for retailers and manufactures that are illegally selling to youth. FDA commissioner Scott Gottlieb, M.D., has indicated that this is a first step in a new and significant enforcement strategy against the e-cigarette industry. In November 2018, the FDA announced new steps to curb youth vaping while still ensuring the adults who would benefit from e-cigarettes still had access to a healthier nicotine delivery system. Sales of flavored tobacco products will be limited to adult only stores and online vendors with the exception of tobacco, mint or menthol e-cigarettes that will remain for sales wherever combustible cigarettes are sold (convenience stores). If the FDA does not see a change in the illegal youth access of menthol or minty vapes currently 20% of their use, they will move to adjust their regulations. The decision to allow menthol vapes was to ensure that an alternative was present should an adult go to purchase menthol cigarettes. The age verification of online vendors for vape products will see an increased level of security.

In the midst of an outbreak of lung illness in the US linked to vaping products, Donald Trump said in September 2019 that his administration is planning to propose a ban on e-cigarette liquid flavors. In December 2019, congress enacted a law raising the age for sale of all tobacco products, including electronic cigarettes, from 18 to 21 years old. In 2020, the FDA ordered a halt on sales of vaping products with sweet and fruity flavors. In 2021, the FDA has denied marketing approval for a large number of e-cigarette products. In 2022, the FDA targeted the company Juul, denying it a marketing application and ordering Juul's products off of the US the market. However, some regulatory loopholes (specifically around disposable, pre-filled products) still allow flavored products from other companies.

State regulation 

In the United States, different measures have been taken to regulate e-cigarettes. In March 2010, New Jersey became the first state to implement e-cigarette Minimum Legal Sale Age Law (MLSA) and comprehensive indoor use ban in workplaces, restaurants, and bars. That same year, Minnesota imposed the first e-cigarette tax in the country. Six years later, the Food and Drug Administration's Center for Tobacco Products (FDA-CTP) deemed e-cigarettes to be tobacco products. In May 2016, the FDA-CTP made the following requirements: e-cigarettes are required to carry a warning label, a national e-cigarette MLSA of 18 was put in place, and the FDA-CTP must eventually approve all e-cigarette products through a pre-market application process.

Effective 8 August 2016, all US states will follow the same, uniform federal guidelines. With an absence of federal regulations, many states and cities had adopted their own e-cigarette regulations, most commonly to prohibit sales to minors, including Maryland, Kentucky, Minnesota, New Jersey, New Hampshire, Tennessee, Utah, Wisconsin, and Colorado. Other states are considering similar legislation. Several US cities and states have enacted laws that increased the legal age to purchase e-cigarettes to age 21. , some states in the US permit e-cigarettes to be taxed as tobacco products, and some state and regional governments in the US had extended their indoor smoking bans to include e-cigarettes.

Governor Arnold Schwarzenegger vetoed a bill that would regulate the sale of e-cigarettes within the state on grounds that "if adults want to purchase and consume these products with an understanding of the associated health risks, they should be able to do so."

A review of regulations in 40 U.S. states found that how a law defines e-cigarettes is critical, with some definitions allowing e-cigarettes to avoid smoke-free laws, taxation, and restrictions on sales and marketing. Fewer policies have been created to restrict vaping indoors than with cigarette smoking.

Many local and state jurisdictions have recently begun enacting laws that prohibit e-cigarette usage everywhere that smoking is banned, although some state laws with comprehensive smoke-free laws will still allow for vaping to be permitted in bars and restaurants while prohibiting e-cigarettes in other indoor places. As of August 2016, the United States Navy is considering banning e-cigarettes. A 2017 report stated "As of 2 October 2015, five US states and over 400 counties have implemented some form of restriction of ECIG use indoors. International policies are more varied with certain restrictions for ECIG use in UK airports and trains and reports of complete ECIG bans in indoor public places for Malta, Belgium and Spain". San Francisco banned the sale of flavored e-liquids in 2018. They are the first city in the US to enact such a ban.

In November 2018, the FDA required e-cigarette manufacturers not to sell e-cigarette products online without strict age verification. It was also requested e-cigarette suppliers to end bulk purchasing of e-cigarettes and to remove flavored e-cigarettes from stores. In January 2020, the city of San Francisco banned e-cigarette (but not traditional cigarettes). By January 2020, twenty states had implemented e-cigarettes taxes, sixteen had comprehensively banned indoor use of the product, and eight had imposed temporary restrictions on the sale of all e-cigarettes or flavored e-cigarettes.

Policy evaluation studies 

Studies that examine the impact of e-cigarette taxes on use of e-cigarettes and traditional cigarettes have found that e-cigarette taxes increase cigarette use across different populations (adults, children, pregnant), thus providing evidence that the two products are economic substitutes. Along the same line, another study found that e-cigarette minimum legal purchase age laws increase cigarette use among 12 to 17 years old, suggesting that e-cigarettes are displacing youth smoking rather than acting as a gateway to youth smoking. Regarding indoor vaping regulations, one study found that it increased prenatal smoking by about 0.8 percentage points had no significant impact on birth outcomes.

Other countries and regions
Australia The Federal Department of Health and Ageing classifies every form of nicotine, except for replacement therapies and cigarettes, as a form of poison. In Australia, there are no laws pertaining to the regulation of e-cigarettes. Although there are a number of laws that are relevant to the regulation of poisons, therapeutic goods, and tobacco control which are applicable to e-cigarettes in certain cases. Australia is developing regulations on e-cigarettes. The sale of e-cigarettes must be registered with the Therapeutic Goods Administration (TGA) before being sold. Importation of e-cigarettes and their related products, if they claim to help people quit smoking, is illegal unless approved by the TGA. The TPA has said that there were no laws preventing the importation of e-cigarettes bought over the internet for personal use, unless prohibited by state and territory legislation. State laws in Australia's various states are a little bit conflicting. According to the Poisons Standard of 2010, inhaled nicotine is Pharmacy Only, or a Schedule 2 medication when used to help quit smoking. In April 2014 a court decision made it illegal to sell or supply e-cigarettes regardless of their appearance or nicotine content (even if zero) in Western Australia. Previously they were banned if they looked like cigarettes. The court ruled that the action they provided in and of itself looks like cigarettes. Precise rules in the other states vary.
Argentina: The sale, importation and manufacturing of e-cigarettes have been banned by the local regulatory authority. Its use has also been discouraged by the National Clinical Practice Guideline for Tobacco Cessation from lack of enough evidence.
Brazil: The sale, importation and advertising of any kind of e-cigarette is forbidden. The Brazilian health and sanitation federal agency, Anvisa, found the current health safety assessments about e-cigarettes to not be yet satisfactory for commercial approval eligibility.

Canada: E-cigarettes are mostly unregulated. They are technically illegal to sell, as no nicotine-containing e-fluid is approved by Health Canada, but this is generally unenforced and they are commonly available for sale Canada-wide. Vancouver bans use of e-cigarettes in public places where smoking is prohibited. Toronto bans use of e-cigarettes in city work spaces. The governing Liberals recently introduced a provincial legislation in Ontario to regulate e-cigarette devices. Local vape shops in Ontario currently trying to Fight Bill 45. The city of Red Deer bans electronic cigarette use where smoking is prohibited.
Mexico: The Federal Commission for the Protection Against Sanitary Risks had previously forbidden the selling and promotion of non-tobacco objects that included elements generally associated with tobacco products. The ban was overturned in court on 23 September 2015.
New Zealand: E-cigarettes and nicotine vaping products are legal.
Panama: The importation, distribution and sale of e-cigarettes have been prohibited since June 2009. The Ministry of Health cites the FDA findings as their reasoning for the ban.

Criticism of vaping bans 
Critics of vaping bans state that vaping is a much safer alternative to smoking tobacco products and that vaping bans incentivize people to return to smoking cigarettes. For example, critics cite the British Journal of Family Medicine in August 2015 which stated, "E-cigarettes are 95% safer than traditional smoking."  Additionally, San Francisco's chief economist, Ted Egan, when discussing the San Francisco vaping ban stated the city's ban on e-cigarette sales will increase smoking as vapers switch to combustible cigarettes.  Critics of smoking bans stress the absurdity of criminalizing the sale of a safer alternative to tobacco while tobacco continues to be legal. Prominent proponents of smoking bans are not in favor of criminalizing tobacco either, but rather allowing consumers to have the choice to choose whatever products they desire.

In 2022, after  two years of review, the Food and Drug Administration (FDA) denied Juul's application to keep its tobacco and menthol flavored vaping products on the market.  Critics of this denial note that research published in Nicotine and Tobacco Research found that smokers who transitioned to Juuls in North America were significantly more likely to switch to vaping than those in the United Kingdom who only had access to lower-strength nicotine products. This happens as the Biden Administration seeks to mandate low-nicotine cigarettes which, critics note, is not what makes cigarettes dangerous. They also note that vaping does not contain many of the components that make smoking dangerous such as the combustion process and certain chemicals that are present in cigarettes that are not present in vape products.

Notes

References

External links
 Database of laws regulating e-cigarettes by country — from the Johns Hopkins Bloomberg School of Public Health

Smoking cessation
Health law
Electronic cigarettes
Regulation